Jurk may refer to:

People
Thomas Jurk (born 1962), German politician
Ulrike Jurk (born 1979), German volleyball player

Other uses
De jurk or The Dress, a 1996 Dutch comedy film
Legal Aid for Women (Norwegian: Juridisk rådgivning for kvinner (JURK)), a Norwegian NGO

See also
Jerk (disambiguation)